Edward Earle Marsh (December 20, 1929 – May 29, 2004) was an American actor, musician, adult film director and star. He is principally known by his stage name Zebedy Colt.

Early years
Born in California, Marsh began his career as a child actor in Hollywood, for one thing uncredited, dressed in costume as one of the Three Little Pigs in the Laurel and Hardy 1934 classic BABES IN TOYLAND. In the late '60s he became an innovator of "queer cabaret" when he recorded the early gay album "I’ll Sing for You" with the London Philharmonic Orchestra. This was the first time he used the "Zebedy Colt" name. Controversial in its day, the album consisted of original gay-themed compositions (credited to his real name) and songs originally meant to be sung by women (e.g., George Gershwin’s "The Man I Love"), but given a homosexual twist by being covered by a man.

In November 1969 Marsh wrote a letter to Time magazine, using his "Zebedy Colt" pseudonym, in response to an article published in its October 31, 1969, edition entitled "Behavior: A Discussion: Are Homosexuals Sick?", using his Stockton, New Jersey, address, in which he argued that gays were then "becoming more and more a part of the mainstream."

Career
Marsh entered the pornographic film world in middle age, primarily as a way of financially supporting himself. He chose to resurrect the "Zebedy Colt" name from his "I’ll Sing for You" album for his porn directing/acting work both to conceal his true identity and as a way of separating this from his Broadway work. On one occasion, however, Marsh's double life was uncovered when the Broadway company he was with went to see The Story of Joanna and were surprised to see their co-star playing a bisexual butler. Marsh later recalled one of them telling him, "Darling, you can be my butler anytime". A similar situation occurred when Marsh was appearing in an off-Broadway play with Sandy Dennis. Dennis thought she recognized Marsh from an adult film she had been to see with her mother, and was delighted to have this confirmed when she asked him "are you Zebedy Colt".

His films as a director include Farmer's Daughters (1976, starring a young Spalding Gray), White Fire (1976, as Roger Colmont), the sadistic The Devil Inside Her (1977, shot at Marsh's home in Lambertville, New Jersey), Unwilling Lovers (1977), and Terri's Revenge (1977).

As an actor in adult films, he starred in such pictures as Radley Metzger Barbara Broadcast, Gerard Damiano The Story of Joanna, Manhold—a 3D film—and the Death Wish porn rip-off Sex Wish. His Broadway acting work included appearing as Anthony Newley’s understudy in The Roar of the Greasepaint - The Smell of the Crowd as well as performances in The Royal Family, Dark at the Top of the Stairs and an award-winning 1976 production of Tom Stoppard's Travesties. He was also known in New Jersey and Pennsylvania for directing and performing in Regional and Community Theatre Productions.

One uncredited film appearance, shared anecdotally in his Las Vegas home a year before his death: one of the children seated on the ground of the forest in The Adventures of Robin Hood with Errol Flynn.

Marsh retired from adult films in the early 1980s, due to concerns over the criminal element (citing the murder of Dutch businessman Navred Reef who directed him in the film Sharon) in the industry as well as the drop in quality due to the change from film to video. He spent his final years in Las Vegas, entertaining friends and neighbors with scrapbooks that documented his long career.

References

External links
 

1929 births
2004 deaths
20th-century American male actors
20th-century American musicians
American actors in gay pornographic films
American film directors
American male stage actors
American pornographic film directors
Bisexual male pornographic film actors
Directors of gay pornographic films
American LGBT musicians
LGBT people from California
LGBT pornographic film actors
Male pornographic film actors
Place of death missing
Pornographic film actors from California
20th-century LGBT people